The Cocosates or Cocosates Sexsignani were an Aquitani tribe dwelling in present-day Landes during the Iron Age.

Name 
They are mentioned as Cocosates by Caesar (mid-1st c. BC), and as Cocosates Sexsignani by Pliny (1st c. AD).

The etymology of the name remains obscure. It can be derived from the Gaulish stem cocos- ('scarlet red') attached to the suffix -ates ('belonging to'). Red is a colour commonly used in personal names (Cocus, Cocca, Cocidius, etc.) and associated with warfare.

Geography 
The Cocosates lived in present-day Landes. Their territory was located east of the Atlantic Ocean, west of the Oscidates and Sotiates, north of the Tarbelli and Tarusates, and south of the Boii.

Their chief town was known as Caequosa (modern Sescouze, near Castets).

Political organization 
The Cocosates were a confederation of six tribes. They were probably clients of the neighbouring Tarbelli.

See also 
 Aquitani
 Gallia Aquitania

References

Bibliography

Further reading
 Jacques Lemoine, Toponymie du Pays Basque Français et des Pays de l'Adour, Picard 1977, 
 Jean-Pierre BOST, Dax et les Tarbelles, "L ’Adour maritime de Dax à BAYONNE".

Aquitani
Basque history